is a Japanese judoka. She won the silver medal in the half-middleweight (63 kg) division at the 2010 World Judo Championships.
Tanaka was a coach with the company judo team Ryotokuji, and as of January 2017 is part of the coaching staff of the Israeli women's national team.

References

External links

 
 
 

1987 births
Living people
Japanese female judoka
Universiade medalists in judo
Universiade gold medalists for Japan
Universiade silver medalists for Japan
Medalists at the 2011 Summer Universiade
Medalists at the 2009 Summer Universiade
21st-century Japanese women